Jagat Singh (1884–1951) was an Indian Surat Shabd Yoga practitioner and initiate of the Sant and Radha Soami Satsang Beas  Guru Sawan Singh. He worked as a college chemistry professor at an Agricultural College and was honoured for meritorious service by the British as Sardar Bahadur. After retirement he was chosen by his spiritual master to be his successor, becoming the third spiritual head of Radha Soami Satsang Beas.  Remembered as quiet, inconspicuous, and unassuming, he was once described by the Muslim mystic Sain Lasoori Shah of Lyallpur as a "perfect disciple" who became a "perfect Master".

Background
Jagat Singh was born on 27 July 1884 into a family of prosperous and religious Jat Sikh farmers, in the small village of Nussi in the Jalandhar District of the Punjab, India. His parents were Sardar Bhola Singh, a farmer, and Mata Nand Kaur. His father Sardar Bhola Singh died when Jagat Singh was five years old. He was raised by his father's aunt (stepmother) Bibi Rukmani Kaur. He received his initial education in the Christian Mission School at Jalandhar. He then passed his MSc degree in Chemistry at the Government College of Lahore. He joined the Punjab Agricultural College, Lyallpur, in 1911 as Assistant Professor of Chemistry and retired as Vice Principal of the institution in 1943 receiving the title Sardar Bahadur for his thirty-two years of meritorious service.

Spiritual path

In Abbotabad on 28 December 1910 at the age of twenty-six, he was initiated into the meditation practice of Surat Shabd Yoga (also known as Nam Bhakti) by Sawan Singh. He had gone there with his cousin Sardar Bhagat Singh Kaler and the Judge Rai Sahib Munshi Ram to hear his future guru, who was still in service there, deliver satsang.
Throughout his own career as a college professor he made it a point to spend most of his weekends with his guru Hazur Maharaj Sawan Singh at the Dera and to spend most of his time in the Surat Shabd Yoga meditation practice. After his retirement in 1943, he lived permanently at Radha Soami Satsang Beas.

Demise 
He died on the morning of 23 October 1951. Before he died he appointed Charan Singh as his spiritual successor in a written will.

Books
He wrote following books. 
 The Science of the Soul (English) 
 Discourses on Sant Mat II (English)

References

 Jagat Singh, Discourses on Sant Mat, volume 2. Compiled translated talks. 
 Jagat Singh, Science of the Soul, Beas: Radha Soami Satsang Beas. Compiled translated excerpts from talks and letters. 
 Kapur, Daryai Lal, Heaven on Earth, Beas: Radha Soami Satsang Beas, 1986. Historical narrative. 
 Munshi Ram, With the Three Masters, volume 2 and volume 3, Beas: Radha Soami Satsang Beas. Diary excerpts.
 In the Footsteps of the Master. Biographical photograph album. Radha Soami Satsang Beas, 1993.

Notes

External links
 Radha Soami Satsang Beas
 The Science of the Soul - The Wisdom of Guru Ji

Surat Shabd Yoga
Sant Mat gurus
1884 births
1951 deaths
Sardar Bahadurs